Berane Municipality (Montenegrin and Serbian: Opština Berane / Општина Беране) is one of the municipalities in the northern Montenegro. The center is Berane. Until 2013, it covered an area of 544 km2, and it had a population of 33,970 at the 2011 Census. In 2013, however, Petnjica Municipality was formed out of the eastern part of Berane Municipality.  The population lowered to 28,515.

Geography and location
Berane is located in northeastern part of Montenegro, in the Lim river valley region between the peaks of Bjelasica in the west, Cmiljevica in the east, Tivran gorge in the north, being part of Sandžak region. Berane has a very favorable traffic-geographical position because it is connected with the main road to Serbia, and via Rozaje and Chakor to Kosovo. The Lim valley is also connected by the main road to the southern part of Serbia and the southeastern part of Bosnia and Herzegovina.

Municipal parliament
The municipal parliament consists of 35 deputies elected directly for a four-year term.

Demographics 
Town of Berane with population of 11,073 is administrative centre of Berane Municipality, which in 2011 had a population of 33,970. According to the 2011 census, the ethnic composition of the municipality was;

Gallery

See also
Petnjica Municipality, part of Berane Municipality until 2013.

References

 
Municipalities of Montenegro